Mystery of the Whale Tattoo is Volume 47 in the original The Hardy Boys Mystery Stories published by Grosset & Dunlap.

This book was outlined by Andrew E. Svenson and written by Jerrold Mundis in 1968 for the Stratemeyer Syndicate.

This story is based in Bayport where two teenagers, the Hardy Boys, try to solve the mystery of pickpockets at a traveling carnival. Both of the Hardy Boys had something very valuable stolen from them, and they later find out that a group of teenagers are the culprits. Each one of the group has a whale tattoo.

Cultural References
The plot of the novel is adapted and repeatedly referenced in the Hulu series Only Murders in the Building.

References

The Hardy Boys books
1968 American novels
1968 children's books
Grosset & Dunlap books